The 11th General Assembly of Prince Edward Island represented Prince Edward Island between July 25, 1820, and 1825.

The Assembly convened the pleasure of the Governor of Prince Edward Island, Charles Douglass Smith. The speaker was Angus McAulay.

Members

The following were members of this Assembly.

External links 
 Journal of the House of Assembly of Prince Edward Island (1820)

Terms of the General Assembly of Prince Edward Island
1820 establishments in Prince Edward Island
1825 disestablishments in Prince Edward Island